Buići can refer to one of the following:

Croatia
 Buići, Dubrovnik-Neretva County
 Buići, Istria County